Las Vegas is a city in and the county seat of San Miguel County, New Mexico, United States. Once two separate municipalities (one a city and the other a town), both were named Las Vegas—West Las Vegas ("Old Town") and East Las Vegas ("New Town"); they are separated by the Gallinas River and retain distinct characters and separate, rival school districts.

The population was 13,166 at the 2020 census.

History

Las Vegas was established in 1835 after a group of settlers received a land grant from the Mexican government. The town was laid out in the traditional Spanish Colonial style, with a central plaza surrounded by buildings which could serve as fortifications in case of attack. Las Vegas soon prospered as a stop on the Santa Fe Trail. During the Mexican–American War in 1846, Stephen W. Kearny delivered an address at the Plaza of Las Vegas claiming New Mexico for the United States. In 1847, the town was the site of the Battle of Las Vegas, which was a part of the broader Taos Revolt by local Hispanos and Pueblo peoples against United States forces. In 1877 Las Vegas College, the precursor to Regis University, was founded in Las Vegas by a group of exiled Italian Jesuits. In 1887, Las Vegas College moved to Denver whereupon the name was changed.

The Atchison, Topeka and Santa Fe Railroad arrived at Las Vegas from the north on July 4, 1879. To maintain control of development rights, it established a station and related development one mile (1.6 km) east of the Plaza, creating a separate, rival New Town, as occurred elsewhere in the Old West. The same competing development occurred in Albuquerque, for instance. During the railroad era Las Vegas boomed, quickly becoming one of the largest cities in the American Southwest. Turn-of-the-century Las Vegas featured all the modern amenities, including an electric street railway, the "Duncan Opera House" at the northeast corner of 6th Street and Douglas Avenue, a Carnegie library, the Castañeda Hotel (a major Harvey House), and the New Mexico Normal School (now New Mexico Highlands University). Since the decline and restructuring of the railroad industry began in the 1950s, the city's population has remained relatively constant. Although the two towns have been combined, separate school districts have been maintained (Las Vegas City Schools and West Las Vegas School District).

The anti-colonist organization Las Gorras Blancas was active in the area in the 1890s.

Cowboy Reunions
Beginning in 1915, the Las Vegas Cowboys' Reunions were held annually until 1931; then in 1939, the Cowboys' Reunions were re-established. Their slogan was, "Git Fer Vegas, Cowboy!" These reunions were organized by a group of ranching families and cowboys which soon became the Las Vegas Cowboys' Reunion Association. The Reunions celebrated ranching life, which began in northern New Mexico in the early 1800s and continues into the 21st century. The annual affair included pie eating contests, barbecues, parades, banquets, balls, and "ranch rodeos." In the early years, celebrities—cowhands as well as big-name bands, movie stars like Tom Mix, and artists such as Randall Davey—came to Las Vegas for this event. In later years, famous cowhands participated in the Cowboys' Reunion Rodeos. The Cowboys' Reunions reflected the occupations of the area and attracted huge crowds for their four days of events. In 1952, the Cowboys' Reunion Association invited the Rough Riders Association to join them at the annual rodeo.

Outlaws
The arrival of the railroad in 1879 brought with it businesses, development and new residents, both respectable and dubious. Murderers, robbers, thieves, gamblers, gunmen, swindlers, vagrants, and tramps poured in, transforming the eastern side of the settlement into a virtually lawless brawl. Among the notorious characters were such legends of the Old West as: dentist Doc Holliday and his girlfriend Big Nose Kate, Dave Rudabaugh, Jesse James, Billy the Kid, Wyatt Earp, Mysterious Dave Mather, Hoodoo Brown, and Handsome Harry the Dancehall Rustler.

Historian Ralph Emerson Twitchell once claimed regarding the Old West, "Without exception there was no town which harbored a more disreputable gang of desperadoes and outlaws than did Las Vegas."

Geography

Climate
Las Vegas has a cold semi-arid climate (Köppen climate classification: BSk).

Demographics

As of the census of 2000, there were 14,565 people, 5,588 households, and 3,559 families residing in the city. The racial makeup of the city was 54.21% White, 0.99% African American, 1.96% Native American, 0.61% Asian, 0.10% Pacific Islander, 37.19% from other races, and 4.95% from two or more races. Hispanic people of any race were 82.94% of the population.

As noted in the chart to the right, the population of Las Vegas peaked at 14,753 in 1990. By 2019, the estimated population had decreased 12.43% to 12,919.

There were 5,588 households, out of which 33.0% had children under the age of 18 living with them, 36.0% were married couples living together, 21.2% had a female householder with no husband present, and 36.3% were non-families. 30.4% of all households were made up of individuals, and 9.7% had someone living alone who was 65 years of age or older. The average household size was 2.48 and the average family size was 3.08.

In the city the population was spread out, with 26.4% under the age of 18, 13.3% from 18 to 24, 26.2% from 25 to 44, 21.2% from 45 to 64, and 12.8% who were 65 years of age or older. The median age was 34 years. For every 100 females, there were 90.4 males. For every 100 females age 18 and over, there were 86.2 males.

The median income in 2019 for a household in the city was $26,561 as compared to the New Mexico median income of $49,754 and the national median of $62,843. The median income for a family in Las Vegas was $29,797. Males had a median income of $26,319 versus $21,731 for females. The per capita income for the city was $20.080 as compared to $34,103 nationally as noted in the 2019 Census estimate. In the past, 24.3% of families and 27.8% of the population were below the poverty line, including 35.7% of those under age 18 and 20.1% of those age 65 or over. The most recent figures (2019) as provided by the U. S. Census Bureau estimate the total number of persons (all ages) at or below the poverty line has increased to 35.6%. This is significantly higher than the national average of 10.5% and the State average of 18.2%.

Libraries and museums

New Mexico Highlands University, founded 1893, is home to the Thomas C. Donnelly Library. It supports the teaching, research and community activities of New Mexico Highlands University. It acquires, organizes, preserves and provides access to pertinent information and scholarly materials for curricular needs, intellectual pursuits and personal enrichment of its clientele. It promotes programs and services that emphasize the diversity of the university's multicultural community and heritage. An addition increased the square footage from 23,700 to 53,500 and now holds a book collection of almost 200,000 volumes.

Las Vegas' Carnegie Library, established in 1904, is the only surviving Carnegie Library in New Mexico. Built from a $10,000 donation from philanthropist Andrew Carnegie, its Neo-Classical Revival architecture resembles Thomas Jefferson's Monticello. The library sits in the middle of a park that occupies an entire city block, bordered by Victorian-style homes and buildings.

The City of Las Vegas Museum & Rough Rider Memorial on Grand Avenue, dedicated in 1940, was first established by the decision of Theodore Roosevelt's Rough Riders regiment (the first Volunteer Cavalry Regiment of the Spanish–American War), who named Las Vegas its official reunion home. Their first reunion was held in Las Vegas, June 1899.

The museum, free and open to the public, houses a memorial collection of artifacts, archives and photographs from the Rough Riders and mementos in relation to the 1898 Cuban Campaign of the Spanish–American War, with information on over 200 members of the original regiment, RRR Association documents, etc. The museum illuminates the history of Las Vegas, its connection to the Rough Riders, the Santa Fe Trail and the development of New Mexico. It features collections of local Native American pottery, household items, costumes, ranching and farming equipment, agricultural and mercantile operations, and home life.

Housed in a 1940 Works Progress Administration-funded building, the museum is built of stone, with Pueblo Revival nuances.

Architecture

Las Vegas has numerous historic structures (mostly railroad-era houses and commercial buildings), with over 900 listed on the National Register of Historic Places. Although many buildings are in varying states of deterioration, others have been restored or are awaiting restoration. Some of the city's notable buildings include:

 Dr. H.J. Mueller House, now a Bed and Breakfast called Crow's Nest Bed and Breakfast. An 1881 example of Victorian eclecticism with unusual octagonal tower
 Plaza Hotel, 1881, site of the first reunion of Teddy Roosevelt's Rough Riders in 1899
 Old City Hall, New Mexico's first municipal building, completed in 1892
 Louis Fort House, Queen Anne house on Carnegie Park, built in 1895
 Masonic Temple, Richardsonian Romanesque building erected in 1895
 Castañeda Hotel, mission-style Harvey House built in 1898
 Carnegie Library, built in 1903 at the center of Carnegie Park and modeled after Monticello

Education

Public schools
The City of Las Vegas is served by two public school districts.
 Las Vegas City Schools serves the east side of Las Vegas.
 West Las Vegas School District serves the west side of Las Vegas.

The City of Las Vegas has two major high schools:
 Robertson High School
 West Las Vegas High School

Colleges
Las Vegas is the home of New Mexico Highlands University, an important university in New Mexico especially for teacher training. Highlands has long had an excellent science, drama, art, and foreign language faculty. The art department was nationally renowned in the 1950s to 1970s and beyond. Also nearby, north of Las Vegas, is Luna Community College. The United World College in nearby Montezuma, New Mexico is a two-year international high school and one of the venues used by the International Baccalaureate Program for teacher training in the United States.

Transportation

Railway
 Las Vegas Amtrak Station is a stop on the Southwest Chief route.

Airport
 Las Vegas Municipal Airport serves single engine planes, small commercial jets, and helicopters.

Major highways
 Interstate 25
 Interstate 40 (55 miles to the south via U.S. Route 84)

Bus service
 None

Films and television
Movies and television shows filmed in and around Las Vegas include:
 Many silent Western films were made in and around Las Vegas, especially in the years 1913–1915, including several that starred Tom Mix.
 The 1962–1963 NBC television western series Empire and its second-season version entitled Redigo were filmed in Santa Fe and near Storrie Lake in Las Vegas.
 In the 1969 movie Easy Rider, Las Vegas, New Mexico, is the town where the two bikers ride behind a parade, are arrested for "parading without a permit," and meet Jack Nicholson's character in jail. The name of the town can be viewed in the background in one scene during this part of the movie.
 The town was the filming location for parts of the 1978 movie Convoy, a film about truck drivers inspired by the 1975 song of the same name.
 Las Vegas stood in for the fictional Calumet, Colorado in John Milius' 1984 film Red Dawn. As of 2022, many of the buildings and structures seen in the film remained.
 Parts of the 1994 film Speechless, with Geena Davis and Michael Keaton, about a fictional New Mexico senatorial campaign, were filmed in Las Vegas.
 Most of the 1994 film Wyatt Earp, with Kevin Costner was filmed in Las Vegas, though it was set in Kansas.
 Several scenes in the 1998 film John Carpenter's Vampires were filmed on the plaza.
 The Hi-Lo Country and All the Pretty Horses, released in 1998 and 2000 respectively, were almost entirely shot here.
 In the 2001 documentary Freedom Downtime, a cross-country road trip to Las Vegas, Nevada, ends up in Las Vegas, New Mexico, by mistake.
 The 2003 film Blind Horizon
 In 2006, the film Fanboys used Las Vegas as one of its film locations. The film is about a dying Star Wars fan and was released in 2009.
 Portions of the 2006 movie The Astronaut Farmer were filmed here.
 The 2007 film Wild Hogs starring John Travolta included scenes filmed around Las Vegas.
 Most of the 2007 Coen brothers' No Country for Old Men was filmed here.
 The 2008 music video Beer for My Horses starring Toby Keith and Rodney Carrington was filmed in and around Las Vegas.
 The 2009 thriller Not Forgotten was shot in Las Vegas for incentive reasons.
 The 2010 film Due Date starring Robert Downey Jr. and Zach Galifianakis was partly filmed in Las Vegas, and was used as a fake border crossing into Mexico.
 Scenes for the 2011 film Paul starring Simon Pegg and Nick Frost with Kristen Wiig, Jason Bateman, Bill Hader, Seth Rogen, Joe Lo Truglio and Sigourney Weaver, were filmed in and around Las Vegas.
 The 2012 A&E TV series Longmire starring Robert Taylor and Katee Sackhoff and set in Wyoming was filmed in Las Vegas.
 The TV series House of Cards filmed in Las Vegas in November 2014 for two weeks. The footage was used in the third-season finale.
The TV series Good Luck Charlie aired episode "Weekend in Vegas" in which one of the main characters travels to Las Vegas with her best friend and her family, thinking they were going to the city of the same name in Nevada.
The Criminal Minds season 11 episode "Outlaw" takes place in Las Vegas, New Mexico.

Media
Las Vegas is served by an award-winning bi-weekly newspaper, the Las Vegas Optic. It is published on Wednesday and Friday.

The Fort Union Drive-in theater is located on 7th Street in Las Vegas.

The Indigo Theater is located at 146 Bridge Street in Las Vegas.

Notable people
 Antonia Apodaca (1923-2020), musician
 Paula Angel (1842–1861), murderer, only woman to be executed in post-colonial New Mexico
 S. Omar Barker (1894–1985), oft-recited cowboy poet; born in a log cabin in New Mexico, where he lived his entire life as a rancher, legislator, WW1 veteran, teacher and writer
 Margaret Herrera Chávez (1912–1992), painter
 Ann Nolan Clark (1896–1995), teacher in public schools and reservations, writer of children's multicultural books
 Teresa Leger Fernandez (born 1959), attorney, member of the U.S. House of Representatives (current)
 Wally Funk (born 1939), aviator, astronaut, and Goodwill Ambassador 
 Fabiola Cabeza de Baca Gilbert (1894–1991), educator, nutritionist, activist, writer, inventor of the u-shaped fried taco shell
 Pelham D. Glassford (1883–1959), U.S. Army brigadier general
 Eddie Guerrero (1967–2005), professional wrestler for WWE, wrestled for New Mexico Highlands University
 Edgar Lee Hewett (1865-1946), archaeologist and anthropologist, founder of the Museum of New Mexico and first president of the New Mexico Normal School (now New Mexico Highlands University)
 Mari-Luci Jaramillo (1928–2019), educator and U.S. Ambassador to Honduras under Jimmy Carter
 Andrieus A. Jones (1862–1927), school principal and attorney, mayor of Las Vegas (1893–1894), United States Senator (1917–1927)
 Margaret Larkin (1899–1967), writer and musician; born in Las Vegas
 Ray Leger (1925–2009), educator and member of the New Mexico Senate
 Pola Lopez (born 1954), artist
 George J. Maloof Sr. (1923–1980), heir and businessman; born in Las Vegas
 Frank Olmstead (1923–2004), mayor of Las Vegas and 18th Auditor of New Mexico
 Patrick Swayze (1952–2009), actor, dancer and singer-songwriter; owned a ranch on the Gallinas River near Las Vegas

References

External links

 City website
 Chamber of Commerce

 
Cities in New Mexico
Cities in San Miguel County, New Mexico
Santa Fe Trail
County seats in New Mexico
Populated places established in 1835
1835 establishments in Mexico